Kim Jong-kwan (born 1975) is a South Korean film director and screenwriter. Kim is an acclaimed and prolific short filmmaker known for his inventive short form narratives. He has helmed the omnibuses Lovers (2008) and Come, Closer (2010). His first feature Worst Woman (2016) which debuted at the 17th Jeonju International Film Festival, won the FIRESCI Award at the 38th Moscow International Film Festival in 2016.

Personal life 
Born in 1975 in Daejeon, Kim graduated from Seoul Institute of the Arts, majoring in Film.

Filmography

Short films 
Street Story (2000) - director
Wind Story (2002) - director, screenwriter, cinematographer
Wounded (2002) - director, screenwriter, cinematographer, editor
The Limit Time of Distribution (2003) - cinematographer
Tell Her I Love Her (2003) - director, screenwriter, cinematographer, art director, editor, producer
How to Operate a Polaroid Camera (2004) - director, screenwriter, cinematographer, art director, editor
One Shining Day (segment: "Good-bye") (2005) - director, screenwriter 
Waiting for Youngjae (2005) - director, screenwriter, editor
Slowly (2005) - director, screenwriter, editor
Monologue #1 (2006) - director, screenwriter, cinematographer, editor, producer
A Lonely Season (2006) - director
Dialogue of Silence (2006) - director
Screwdriver (2006) - director, cinematographer, editor 
Series Dasepo Naughty Girl (2006) - director
Short! Short! Short! (segment: "'Waiting") (2007) - director, screenwriter, cinematographer 
The Diaper Of Daughters (2007) - cinematographer
Lost (2007) - director, screenwriter, cinematographer
Trend Of This Fall (2008) - director, screenwriter, editor
Short! Short! Short! (segment: "Coin Boy") (2009) - director 
Whispers In The Wind (2010) - director
One Perfect Day (2013) - screenwriter
Phantoms of the Archive (2014) - director, screenwriter
Persona (2019) - director, screenwriter

Omnibus films 
Lovers (2008) - director, screenwriter, cinematographer, editor, producer (consisting of 11 short films)
Come, Closer (2010) - director, screenwriter

Feature films 
Worst Woman (2016) - director, screenwriter
The Table  (2016) - director, screenwriter
Chae's Movie Theater (2017) - director
Shades of the Heart (2019) - director, screenwriter
Josée (2020) - director, screenwriter

References

External links 
 
 
 

1975 births
Living people
South Korean film directors
South Korean screenwriters
Seoul Institute of the Arts alumni